The 2013 Party in the Poconos 400 was a NASCAR Sprint Cup Series stock car race  held on June 9, 2013, at Pocono Raceway in Long Pond, Pennsylvania, United States. Contested over 160 laps on the 2.5–mile (4 km) triangular superspeedway, it was the fourteenth race of the 2013 Sprint Cup Series championship. Jimmie Johnson of Hendrick Motorsports won the race, his third win of the 2013 season, while Greg Biffle finished second. Dale Earnhardt Jr., Tony Stewart, and Ryan Newman rounded out the top five.

This was the final NASCAR race for Jason Leffler before his death in a sprint car crash on June 12, 2013.

Report

Background

The track's turns are banked differently; the first is banked at 14°, the second turn at 8° and the final turn with 6°. However, each of the three straightaways are banked at 2°. The front stretch at Pocono Raceway is 3,740 feet long, the longest at the track. The back stretch, is 3,055 feet long, while the short stretch, which connects turn two with turn three, is only 1,780 feet long. Joey Logano was the defending race winner after winning the race in 2012.

Before the race, Johnson was leading the Drivers' Championship with 473 points, while Carl Edwards stood in second with 443 points. Clint Bowyer followed in the third with 423, 24 points ahead of Matt Kenseth and Kevin Harvick in fourth and fifth. Dale Earnhardt Jr., with 398, was in sixth; six ahead of Kasey Kahne, who was scored seventh. Eighth-placed Kyle Busch was three points ahead of Paul Menard and five ahead of Brad Keselowski in ninth and tenth. Jeff Gordon was eleventh with 361, while Aric Almirola completed the first twelve positions with 354 points. In the Manufacturers' Championship, Chevrolet was leading with 92 points, eight points ahead of Toyota. Ford was third after recording only 64 points before the race.

Practice and qualifying

Three practice sessions were held before the race. The first session, scheduled on June 7, 2013 for 90 minutes, was canceled because of rain showers. The second and third, held a day later on June 8, 2013, were 50 and 60 minutes long.

Forty-three cars were entered for qualifying. However, wet weather soaked the track, therefore canceling the session and making the  owner's points championship determine the qualifying grid. Johnson, whose owner was first in the owner's championship before the race, was rewarded the pole position. He was joined on the front row of the grid by Edwards. Bowyer was third, Kenseth took fourth, ahead of Earnhardt Jr. who started fifth. Kahne, Kyle Busch, Menard, Keselowski and Gordon rounded out the first ten positions.

In the Saturday morning session, Johnson was quickest, ahead of Edwards and Kurt Busch in second and third. Marcos Ambrose and Harvick followed in the fourth and fifth positions. Kyle Busch, Tony Stewart, Earnhardt Jr., Keselowski, and Juan Pablo Montoya rounded out the first ten positions. In the final practice session for the race, Kurt Busch was quickest with a time of 51.331 seconds. Johnson followed in second, ahead of Edwards and Stewart in third and fourth. Ryan Newman, who was fifteenth quickest in second practice, managed fifth.

Results

Qualifying

Race results

Notes

 Points include 3 Chase for the Sprint Cup points for winning, 1 point for leading a lap, and 1 point for most laps led.

Standings after the race

Drivers' Championship standings

Manufacturers' Championship standings

Note: Only the first twelve positions are included for the driver standings.

References

Party in the Poconos 400
Party in the Poconos 400
Party in the Poconos 400
NASCAR races at Pocono Raceway